Domonkos Széll (born 25 July 1989 in Budapest) is a Hungarian rower. He competed at the 2012 Summer Olympics in London in the Men's Pair event together with his teammate Béla Simon. They were eliminated in the repechage round.

References

1989 births
Living people
Rowers at the 2012 Summer Olympics
Hungarian male rowers
Olympic rowers of Hungary
Rowers from Budapest